Cursed is the sixth studio album by Finnish grindcore band Rotten Sound. Music videos were made for "Hollow" and "Self".

Track listing

Personnel
Keijo Niinimaa – vocals
Mika Aalto – guitars
Sami Latva – drums
Kristian Toivainen – bass

Additional personnel
Saku Hakuli – lead guitar on "Self" and "Hollow"
Eran Segal – lead guitar on "Plan"
Juha Ylikoski – lead guitar on "Ritual"
Johan Eriksson – vocals on "Self"
L-G Petrov – vocals on "Superior" and "Choose"
Jason Netherton – vocals on "Alone", "Hollow", "Machinery", and "Terrified"

Production
Nico Elgstrand – engineering
Scott Hell – mastering editor
Panu Posti – mastering, mixing, production
Orion Landau – artwork

References

2011 albums
Rotten Sound albums
Relapse Records albums